Sidhu may refer to:

 Sidhu, a Jat clan found in India and Pakistan
 Navjot Singh Sidhu, Indian politician
Jaswinder Kaur Sidhu, an Indo-Canadian beautician who was murdered in an honor killing
Sidhu Kanhu, the leader of the Santhal rebellion (1855–1856)
Sidhu Mutsadi, a village in Jalandhar district of Punjab State, India
Sidhu Moose Wala, an Indian singer, lyricist, and politician
Sidhu (musician), an Indian singer

See also
Sidhuwal